Alfredo Rodrigo Duarte ComIH (25 February 1891 – 26 June 1982), better known as Alfredo Marceneiro because of his original profession as a woodworker, (Portuguese marceneiro), was a Portuguese Fado singer, with a singular voice. Marceneiro became a standard against whom generations of fado singers are still measured today.

On 10 June 1984 he was awarded posthumously Commander of the Order of Infante D. Henrique by former President of the Portuguese Republic, General Ramalho Eanes.

1891 births
1982 deaths
Singers from Lisbon
Portuguese fado singers
20th-century Portuguese male singers